The Channings is an 1862 novel by the British writer Ellen Wood. A man takes responsibility for a theft he believes his brother has committed. His brother is really innocent of the crime, and the real culprit is later caught.

Adaptation

In 1920 the novel was adapted into a silent film directed by Edwin J. Collins and starring Lionelle Howard and Dick Webb.

English novels
1862 British novels
British novels adapted into films
Novels by Ellen Wood
Victorian novels